The Leon Chung Company Building, also known as the Caye's Building, is an historic building in southwest Portland, Oregon's Yamhill Historic District, in the United States. The structure currently houses Lúc Lác Vietnamese Kitchen.

References

External links

 

Buildings and structures in Portland, Oregon
Southwest Portland, Oregon